India was one of the first countries in Asia to recognize the effectiveness of the Export Processing Zone (EPZ) model in promoting exports, with Asia's first EPZ set up in Kandla in 1965. In order to overcome the shortcomings experienced on account of the multiplicity of controls and clearances; absence of world-class infrastructure, and an unstable fiscal regime and with a view to attract larger foreign investments in India, the Special Economic Zones (SEZs) Policy was announced in April 2000.

A special economic zone (SEZ) is a geographical region that has economic laws that are more liberal than a country's domestic economic laws. India has specific laws for its SEZs.

The category 'SEZ' covers a broad range of more specific zone types, including free-trade zones (FTZ), export processing zones (EPZ), free zones (FZ), industrial estates (IE), free ports, urban enterprise zones and others. Usually, the goal of a structure is to increase foreign direct investment by foreign investors, typically an international business or a Multi National Corporation (MNC).

In December 2022, Union Minister of State for Electronics and IT Rajeev Chandrasekhar, in a written reply to a question in Rajya Sabha informed that Special Economic Zones have exported software worth Rs 5.3 lakh crore in 2021-22.

State-wise distribution of approved SEZs

Sector-wise Distribution of approved SEZs

List of State-wise Exporting SEZs 
A list of functional Special Economic Zones in India has been published.

SEZs set up by the Central Government 

KASEZ Kandla Special Economic Zone, at Kandla Gandhidham, Gujarat by Govt of India
 SEEPZ Special Economic Zone Mumbai, Maharashtra Electronics and Gems and Jewellery
 Noida Special Economic Zone Uttar Pradesh Multi product
 MEPZ Special Economic Zone Chennai, Tamil Nadu Multi product
 Cochin Special Economic zone Cochin, Kerala Multi product
 Falta Special Economic Zone Falta, West Bengal Multi product
Visakhapatnam SEZ Vishakhapatnam, Andhra Pradesh Visakhapatnam Multi-product

State Government/Private SEZs notified/approved prior to SEZ Act 2005 

 Fazalganj Industrial Estate Kanpur, Uttar Pradesh Acids, Chemicals and Petrochemical
 Surat Special Economic Zone Surat, Gujarat Multi product
 Manikanchan SEZ, West Bengal Kolkata, West Bengal Gems and Jewellery
 Jaipur SEZ Jaipur, Rajasthan Gems and Jewellery
 Indore SEZ Sector-III, Pithampur, District. Dhar (MP) Multi product
 Jodhpur SEZ Jodhpur, Rajasthan Handicrafts
 Banthar Leather Technology Park Unnao (Kanpur Metropolitan Region), Uttar Pradesh Leather
 Salt Lake Electronic City -WIPRO, West Bengal Kolkata, West Bengal Software development and ITES
 Mahindra City SEZ (IT), T. Nadu Tamil Nadu IT/Hardware and Bioinformatics
 Mahindra City SEZ (Auto ancillary ), T. Nadu Tamil Nadu Auto
 Ruma Textile Park Kanpur, Uttar Pradesh Textiles
 Mahindra City SEZ (Textiles), Tamil Nadu Tamil Nadu Apparel and fashion accessories
 Nokia SEZ Sriperumbudur, Tamil Nadu Telecom equipments/R&D services
 Moradabad SEZ Moradabad, Uttar Pradesh  Handicrafts
 Surat Apparel Park Surat, Gujarat IT/Textiles
 Rasi Egg Centre,(agri & allied), Namakkal, Tamil Nadu

Notified Operational Special Economic Zones

Andhra Pradesh 

 VSEZ Duvvada Visakhapatnam Multi product APIIC Atchutapuram Visakhapatnam Multi product
 APIIC, Madhurwada Visakhapatnam IT/ITES
 APIIC, Kapulauppada Visakhapatnam IT/ITES 
 APIIC, Gambheeram Visakhapatnam IT/ITES
 APIIC, Rajayyapeta Visakhapatnam Petroleum, Oil & Gas Industry
 APIIC, Gurrampalem Visakhapatnam Multi product
 Brandix India Apparel City Private Ltd. Achutapuram, Visakhapatnam Textile
 Jawaharlal Nehru Pharma City (Ramky Pharma Cit Pvt. Ltd.) Parawada, Visakhapatnam Pharmaceuticals
 Divi's Laboratories Limited Chippada Village, Visakhapatnam, Andhra Pradesh Pharmaceuticals
 Andhra Pradesh Industrial Infrastructure Corporation Limited Sarpavaram Village, Kakinada Rural East Godavari District, Andhra Pradesh IT/ITES.
 Kakinada SEZ Private Limited Ramanakkapeta and A. V. Nagaram Villages, East Godavari District, Kakinada, Andhra Pradesh Multi-product.
 Apache SEZ Development India Private Limited Mandal Tada, Nellore District, Andhra Pradesh
 Parry Infrastructure Company Private Limited Vakalapudi Village, Kakinada Rural Mandal, Kakinada, Andhra Pradesh Food Processing.
 Sri City Multiproduct SEZ & DTZ in Chittoor District.

Chandigarh 
 Rajiv Gandhi Technology Park, Chandigarh. Chandigarh IT/ITES

Gujarat 

 Million Minds, IT SEZ, Proposed By Ganesh housing Corporation Limited Ahmedabad Gujarat
Kandla SEZ, Gandhidham, Gujarat{KASEZ}
 DGDC SEZ, Surat (SURSEZ)
 GIDC AHMEDABAD APPAREL Park SEZ
 GIDC Electronic Park, Gandhinagar
 Mundra Port & Special Economic Zone, Multi P roduct
 Synefra Engineering and Construction Ltd. Vadodara Hi-tech Engineering products and related services
 Reliance Jamnagar Infrastructure Ltd. Jamnagar Multi Product
 Zydus Infrastructure Pvt. Ltd. Sanand, Ahmedabad Pharmaceutical
 Larsen & Toubro Limited's IT/ ITeS SEZ at Surat, Gujarat
 Calica Group's "3rd eye voice" IT/ITES SEZ, Ahmedabad
 Gallops Engineering SEZ, Moraiyya, Near Changodar, Ahmedabad
 Vatva Ahmedabad
 Infocity IT Park, IT/ITES, Gandhinagar, Gujarat
 GIFT SEZ, GIFT CITY, Gandhinagar, Gujarat
 DAHEJ SEZ 1 and 2, Tal Vagra, Bharuch
 TCS Garima Park IT/ITES SEZ, Gandhinagar
 Surat SEZ
 Surat Apparel Park SEZ
 Sterling SEZ & Infrastructure Ltd.
 K Raheja Corp IT/ITES SEZ, koba, Gandhinagar

Haryana 
 ASF Insignia, Gwal Pahari Gurgaon, Haryana IT/ITES
 DLF Cyber City, Gurgaon Gurgaon, Haryana IT/ITES
 DLF Limited Gurgaon, Haryana IT/ITES
 Gurgaon Infospace Ltd, Gurgaon Gurgaon, Haryana IT/ITES
 Keystone Knowledge Park, Gurgaon, Haryana SEZ
 Reliance Haryana SEZ Limited, Gurgaon, Haryana
 Candor TechSpace, Sector-48, Gurgaon, Haryana

Karnataka 

 International Tech Park, Bangalore IT/ITES
 Manyata Embassy Business Park Bengaluru IT/ITES
 WIPRO Limited Doddakannelli Village, Varthur Hobli, Electronic City, Bengaluru IT
 WIPRO Limited (SR) Doddakannelli Village, Varthur Hobli, Sarjapur Road, Bengaluru IT
 Infosys Technologies SEZ Mangaluru Bengaluru, Karnataka IT/ITES
 Vikas Telecom Limited Bengaluru IT/ITES
 Adarsh Prime Projects Private Limited Devarabeesanahalli, Bhoganahalli and Doddakanahalli,
 Divyasree (Shyamaraju) Kundalahalli, Krishnarajapuram, Bengaluru IT/ITES
 Cessna Garden Developers Pvt. Ltd. Bengaluru IT/ITES
 Global Village Tech Park, Mylasandra Village IT/ITES
 Biocon Limited. Anekal Taluk, Bengaluru (Biotechnology)
 KIADB (textile), Hassan (Textile)
 Primal Projects Private Limited, Bengaluru IT/ITES
 Pritech Park SEZ, Bellandur, Bengaluru (IT/ITES)
 Synefra Engineering and Construction Ltd. (Hi-tech Engg. Products & related services)
 Bagmane Construction Pvt. Ltd. Bengaluru (IT/ITES)
 Aequs SEZ (formerly QuEST Global SEZ Pvt Ltd), Belagavi (Aerospace and IT/BT)

Kerala 

 KINFRA Film and Video Park Thiruvananthapuram IT/ITES
 Electronic Technology Park-SEZ 1 Thiruvananthapuram IT/ITES
 Technopark, Kollam IT/ITES
 Cochin Special Economic Zone Kochi Multi Product
 Infopark Kochi IT/ITES
 Infopark Cherthala IT/ITES
 Smart City Kochi IT/ITES
 NeST Electronics City Kochi Electronics Hardware
 Puthuvype Kochi Port based
 Cyberpark Government Kozhikode IT/ITES
 Cyberpark Ulccs (Private) Kozhikode IT/ITES
 Infopark ThrissurIT/ITES
 Hindalco AlupuramAluminium Smelting
 FACT Alwaye Fertilizer
 Travancore Cochin Chemicals Kalamassery
 Defence Park Ottapalam
 Kanjikode Industrial cluster, Palakkad
 Seafood Park Aroor
 Binnani Zinc Smelltor, Eloor
 Hindustan machine tools Kalamassery
 Adoor industrial cluster, Pathanamthitta
 Textile park, Taliparamba
 Hindustan Latex, Trivandrum
 BIO s 360 Biotechnology Thiruvananthapuram
 Kerala drugs and pharmaceuticals, Alappuzha
 Mc Dowells distilleries, Varanad, Cherthala

Madhya Pradesh 
 Indore SEZ, Pithampur, Indore Multi Product
 Bhopal SEZ, Mandideep,

Maharashtra 

 Hiranandani Builders, Powai - IT/ITES
 Infosys Technologies Ltd., Rajiv Gandhi Infotech Park, Phase II, Maan village, Mulshi taluka, Pune district - IT/ITES
 Serum Bio-pharma Park, Pune - Pharmaceuticals & Biotechnology
 EON Kharadi, Haveli taluka, Pune district - IT/ITES
 WIPRO, Hinjawadi, Pune - IT/ITES
 DLF Akruti - IT/ITES
 Maharashtra Airport Development Corporation (MADC), MIHAN, Nagpur - Multi-Product, The largest multi-product SEZ in Maharashtra
 Wardha Power Company Pvt. Ltd., Chandrapur district - Energy/Power
 Dynasty Developers Pvt. Ltd. (Pune Embassy India Pvt. Ltd.), Pune - IT/ITES
 The Manjri Stud Farm Private Ltd., Pune - IT/ITES
 Maharashtra Industrial Development Corporation Ltd., Pune - IT/ITES
 Syntel International Pvt. Ltd., Pune - IT/ITES
 Magarpatta Township Development and Construction Company Ltd., Pune - Electronics Hardware and Software including ITES
 MIDC, Aurangabad - Aluminium & Related industries
 NMSEZ (Reliance), Navi Mumbai - 
 Mindspace, Airoli, Navi Mumbai -
 Khed Economics Infrastructure Private Limited (KEIPL) (Bharat Forge), Rajgurunagar (Khed), Pune district

Odisha 
 Hindalco Industries SEZ, Sambalpur
 Genpact SEZ IT/ITES
 Infocity Bhubaneswar SEZ IT/ITES
 Infovalley Bhubaneswar SEZ IT/ITES
 IDCO Bhubaneswar IT/ITES
 IDCO Chandaka, Bhubaneswar IT/ITES
 IDCO Knowledge Park, Bhubaneswar
 IDCO Mahakalpada, Bhubaneswar
 Jindal Steel and Power, Choudwar
 Lanco Solar, Cuttack
 POSCO India SEZ, Paradeep
 Saraf Agencies SEZ, Chhatrapur
 Suryo Infra Projects Private Limited, Bhubaneswar
 Tata Consultancy Services SEZ IT/ITES
 Tata Steel SEZ, Gopalpur, Odisha
 Vedanta Resources SEZ, Jharsuguda
 Wellspun SEZ Choudwar
 Wipro SEZ IT/ITES

Rajasthan 
 Mahindra World City (Jaipur) Ltd. Kalwara Village, Jaipur, Rajasthan IT/ITES
 Mansarovar Industrial Development Corporation, Kaparda, Jodhpur, Rajasthan IT/ITES
 Kisan Udyog khara, Bikaner.
 AIC Hindoun City.
 Kaladwas Industrial Estate (SEZ) Udaipur, BHIWADI

Tamil Nadu 

 AMRL SEZ and AMRL FTWZ, Nanguneri, Tirunelveli, Tamil Nadu
 New Chennai Township Private Limited Engineering SEZ ... 
 New Chennai Township Private Limited Multi Services SEZ ... 
 Shriram Properties and Infrastructure Private Limited Perungalathur village, Chennai, Tamil Nadu IT/ITES
 Ilandhaikulam SEZ, Madurai, Tamil Nadu IT/ITES
 Vadapalanji SEZ, Madurai, Tamil Nadu IT/ITES
 SIPCOT Industrial Complex, Thoothukudi, Tamil Nadu
 SIPCOT Information Technology Park, Siruseri, Chennai, Tamil Nadu IT/ITES
 TRIL Inforpark Ltd., Rajiv Gandhi Salai (OMR), Taramani, Chennai, Tamil Nadu IT/ITES
 ETL Infrastructure Services Limited Tambaram Taluk, Kancheepuram District, Chennai, Tamil Nadu  IT/ITES
 SIPCOT Automobile and Engineering SEZ, Coimbatore, Tamil Nadu
 DLF Infocity Developers Ltd. Manapakkam & Mugalivakkam, Chennai, Tamil Nadu IT/ITES
 Arun Excello (Estancia) Infrastructure Private Limited Vallncheri and Potheri villages, Chengalpet Taluk, Kancheepuram District, Chennai Tamil Nadu IT/ITES
 ETA Technopark Private Limited Old Mahabalipuram Road, Navallur Village, Chengalpet Taluk, Chennai
 Kancheepuram District IT/ITES
 Tamil Nadu Industrial Development Corporation Limited (TIDCO) SEZ, Hosur, Krishnagiri District, Tamil Nadu IT/ITES
 Electronics Corporation of Tamil Nadu Kancheepuram, Tamil Nadu IT/ITES
 SIPCOT Multi Sector SEZ, Perundurai , Erode
 ELCOT SEZ, Vilankurichi, Coimbatore
 TIDEL Park Coimbatore, Vilankurichi, Coimbatore, IT/ITES
 TIDEL Park Salem, Special Economic Zone SEZ Salem, ELCOT
 Wipro Technologies ELCOT SEZ – Vilankurichi, Coimbatore
 Wipro Technologies ELCOT SEZ – Sholingnalur, Chennai
 HCL ELCOT SEZ – Sholingnalur, Chennai
 State Industries Promotion Corporation of Tamil Nadu SIPCOT Industrial area Sriperumbudur, Tamil Nadu Electronics of Telecom hardware and support services including trading and logistic activities
 Textiles Special Economic Zone, Uttukuli Taluk, Tirupur District
 State Industries Promotion Corporation of Tamil Nadu Oragadam Electronic Hardware
 Cheyyar SEZ Cheyyar Footwear, Tiruvannamalai District, Tamil Nadu
 Salem IT park SEZ vee technologies, Dalmia board, Salem District Tamil Nadu
 ELCOT IT/ITES SEZ Navalpattu, Trichy

Telangana 
 M/s Telangana Industrial Infrastructure Corporation Ltd. Nanakramguda Village, Serilingampalli Mandal, Ranga Reddy District, Telangana IT/ITES
 CMC Limited Ranga Reddy District, Hyderabad, Telangana IT/ITES
 DivyaSree NSL Infrastructure Private Limited Ranga Reddy District, Hyderabad, Telangana
 Tech Mahindra Limited, Madhapur Ranga Reddy District, Hyderabad, Telangana
 Tech Mahindra Limited, Bahadurpally Ranga Reddy District, Hyderabad, Telangana
 DLF Commercial Developers Ltd Ranga Reddy District, Hyderabad, Telangana IT/ITES
 Hyderabad Gems SEZ Ltd. Ranga Reddy District, Hyderabad, Telangana Gems and Jewellery
 Fab City SPV (India) Pvt. Ltd. R R District Telangana IT/ITES
 L&T Phoenix Infoparks Pvt. Ltd. Mandal, Telangana IT/ITES
 Maytas Hill County SEZ Pvt Ltd-Bachupally Bachupally Village, Mandal IT/ITES
 Serene Properties Pvt Ltd. Pocharam Vil1age, Hayathna Gar, Taluka Ghatkesar Mandal IT/ITES
 Sundew Properties Pvt. Limited Madhapur, RR District IT/ITES
 Wipro Limited-Manikonda Manikonda, Mandal, RR IT/ITES
 Lanco Hills Technology Park Pvt Ltd., SEZ – IT & ITE's, Hyderabad,
 Infosys Technologies Hyderabad SEZ, Pocharam
 IT SEZ, Madikonda, Warangal
 Mind space

West Bengal 
 Unitech Hi-tech Structures Ltd. Rajarhat, Kolkata, West Bengal IT/ITES
 DLF IT SEZ Rajarhat, Kolkata, West Bengal IT/ITES
 SP Infotech Rajarhat (upcoming), Kolkata, West Bengal IT/ITES
 Bengal Gem And Jewellery Park, Salt Lake, Kolkata, West Bengal Jewellery manufacturing and studies
 WIPRO SEZ, Salt Lake Sector V, Kolkata, West Bengal IT/ITES
 Falta Special Economic Zone, Falta, West Bengal, West Bengal, Multi-product
 Kolkata IT park, Bantala
 TCS Gitanjali Park IT/ITES SEZ

Uttar Pradesh 
 HCL IT city, Lucknow, Uttar Pradesh  IT & Start-Up

See also 
 Free-trade zone
 Special economic zone
 Petroleum, Chemicals and Petrochemicals Investment Region

References

External links 
 

Economy of India lists
Special Economic Zones of India